Charles Field may refer to:
Charles Frederick Field (1805–1874), British detective
Charles K. Field (1873–1948), American poet, journalist, and magazine editor
Charles "Oakey" Field (1879–1949), English footballer
Charles W. Field (1828–1892), American military officer
Charles W. Field (Maryland politician) (1857–1917), American politician and lawyer

See also
John Charles Fields (1863–1932), Canadian mathematician
C. C. Field Film Company, established by Charles C. Field